Jean Berstel (born 1941) is a French mathematician and theoretical computer scientist known for his contributions to combinatorics on words and formal language theory. He is a currently a professor emeritus at the University of Marne-la-Vallée.

Biography
Berstel earned his doctorate (doctorat d'État) at Paris Diderot University in 1973. In 1973–1995 he was a professor at Pierre and Marie Curie University, and in 1995–2005 a professor at the University of Marne-la-Vallée, where he has been a professor emeritus since 2005.

In 2006, Berstel was awarded an honorary doctorate from the University of Turku, Finland. A festschrift in his honour was published in 2003 as a special issue of Theoretical Computer Science.

Research contributions
Berstel has been a member of the Lothaire group of mathematicians that developed the foundations of combinatorics of words. He has published several scientific monographs, including
Transductions and Context-free Languages (1979),
Theory of Codes (1985, jointly with Dominique Perrin), and Codes and Automata (2009; jointly with Dominique Perrin and Christophe Reutenauer)
as well as the three Lothaire books.

References

External links
 
 
 

20th-century French mathematicians
French computer scientists
1941 births
Living people
21st-century French mathematicians
Academic staff of Pierre and Marie Curie University
Paris Diderot University alumni